Jorge Zalamea Borda (March 8, 1905 – May 10, 1969) was a Colombian writer, poet, and journalist, best known for his anti-dictatorship satirical prose works. His poems, dramas, novels, and essays are notable for their linguistic richness and ascetic, dense style. He typically explored themes of equality and liberty in his writings. His most well-known works include El sueño de la escalinatas and El Gran Burundú-Burundá ha muerto. He was awarded the Lenin Peace Prize in 1967.

In 1952, Zalamea fled Colombia to escape the repressive regime of president Laureano Gómez. Later that year in Buenos Aires, Argentina, he published one of his most influential works, El gran Burudún-Burundá ha muerto, a satirical work denouncing Gómez.

References

1905 births
1969 deaths
Lenin Peace Prize recipients
People from Bogotá
Colombian male writers
Ambassadors of Colombia to Mexico
Ambassadors of Colombia to Italy